Surf-Jet Girl is the first EP released by surf music band The Surfin' Lungs, released in 1986 on Ace Records' Big Beat label. Produced by Roman Jugg of The Damned, Big Beat had huge plans for the release and were planning a big promotion in which a surf jet was to be given away in a national competition, but the idea never got off the ground. Three of the four tracks were written by the group, but the fourth, Decoy was a cover of a track by 60s surf instrumental group The Sandals.

Track listing 
 Surf-Jet Girl (Pearce, Dean, Knipe) – Lead vocals: Chris Pearce
 Decoy (Gibson, Blakeley) – Instrumental
 Big Man On Campus (Pearce, Dean) – Lead vocals: Chris Pearce
 The Girls Are Feelin' Alright (Pearce, Dean) – Lead vocals: Chris Pearce

Personnel 
 Chris Pearce – vocals, guitar
 Geoffo Knipe – guitar, farfisa organ
 Steve Dean – vocals, bass
 Al Beckett – drums, vocals

Producer 
 Roman Jugg

Trivia 
 Big Man On Campus was actually the first Surfin' Lungs track to feature future member Clive Gilling, who provided handclaps.

1986 EPs
The Surfin' Lungs albums